Marinković is a Serbo-Croatian surname, a patronymic derived from the given name Marinko. It may refer to:

Aleksandar Marinković (footballer, born 1990), football goalkeeper
Bojana Marinković (born 1996), Serbian tennis player
Branko Marinkovic, Bolivian politician and businessman born in Santa Cruz, Bolivia
Dragan Marinković (born 1968), Bosnian actor and TV personality from Sarajevo, Bosnia and Herzegovina
Dragana Marinković (born 1982), volleyball player who competed for the Croatian and Serbian women's national teams in the 2000s
Goran Marinković (born 1979), footballer
Ivan Marinković (born 1993), basketball player
Josif Marinković (1851–1931), one of the most important Serbian composers of the nineteenth century
Nebojša Marinković (born 1986), Serbian footballer who currently plays for Maccabi Petah Tikva F.C. in the Israeli Premier League
Nenad Marinković (born 1988), Serbian footballer
Ranko Marinković (1913–2001), Croatian author
Stefan Marinković (born 1994), Swiss footballer

Croatian surnames
Serbian surnames